Marattiaceae is the only family of extant (living) ferns in the order Marattiales. In the Pteridophyte Phylogeny Group classification of 2016 (PPG I), Marattiales is the only order in the subclass Marattiidae. The family has six genera and about 110 species. Many are different in appearance from other ferns, having large fronds and fleshy rootstocks.

Description
The Marattiaceae diverged from other ferns very early in their evolutionary history and are quite different from many plants familiar to people in temperate zones. Many of them have massive, fleshy rootstocks and the largest known fronds of any fern. The Marattiaceae is one of two groups of ferns traditionally known as eusporangiate ferns, meaning that the sporangium is formed from a group of cells as opposed to a leptosporangium in which there is a single initial cell.

The large fronds characteristic of the group are most readily found in the genus Angiopteris, native to Australasia, Madagascar and Oceania. These fronds may be up to 9 meters long in the species Angiopteris teysmanniana of Java. In Jamaica the species Angiopteris evecta is widely naturalized and is registered as an invasive species. The plant was introduced by Captain Bligh from Tahiti as a staple food for slaves and cultivated in the Castleton Botanical Garden in 1860. From there it was able to distribute itself throughout the eastern half of the island.

Marattia in the strict sense is found in the neotropics and Hawaii. The genus Eupodium is also neotropical, with three species. It has fronds that are 2-5 times pinnate, distinctive stalked synangia, and awns on distal blade segments. Blade division decreases towards the apex of the frond. Plants of Eupodium usually only have one frond per plant per year (sometimes two).

Ptisana is a paleotropical genus. These plants are 2-4 times pinnate, with fronds often comparable in size to those found in Angiopteris. Terminal segments usually have a prominent suture where they attach. The sporangia lack the labiate apertures of Marattia and Eupodium, and synangia are deeply cut. The name of the genus derives from the resemblance of the synangia to pearl barley. The king fern, Ptisana salicina, from New Zealand and the South Pacific and known in Māori as "para" now has been placed in this genus. Sometimes called the potato fern, this is a large fern with an edible fleshy rhizome that is used as a food source by some indigenous peoples.

The East-Asian genus Christensenia is named in honor of the Danish pteridologist Carl Christensen is an uncommon fern with distinctive fronds resembling a horse chestnut leaf, hence the species Christensenia aesculifolia, meaning horse-chestnut-leaved Christensenia. Despite the relatively diminutive size of plants in this genus, the stomata of Christensenia are the largest known in the plant kingdom.

The genus Danaea is endemic to the Neotropics. They have bipinnate leaves with opposite pinnae, which are dimorphic, the fertile leaves much contracted, and covered below with sunken, linear synangia dehiscing via pores.

Taxonomy
in the Pteridophyte Phylogeny Group classification of 2016 (PPG I), Marattiaceae is the only family in the order Marattiales, which in turn is the only order in the subclass Marattiidae. Marattiidae is one of four subclasses of class Polypodiopsida (ferns), to which it is related as shown in this cladogram, being a sister group to Polypodiidae.

History of classification
In the molecular phylogenetic classification of Smith et al. in 2006, the Marattiales formed the single member of the class Marattiopsida. Four genera were recognized. The class was lowered in rank to the subclass Marattiidae in the 2009 classification of Mark W. Chase and James L. Reveal, and subsequent systems such as Christenhusz et al. (2011). The Pteridophyte Phylogeny Group (2016) classification retains this rank. In that system, Marattiidae is monotypic and has one order, Marattiales, one family, Marattiaceae, six genera, and an estimated 111 species.

There have long been four traditional extant genera (Angiopteris, Christensenia, Danaea and Marattia), but phylogenetic analysis has determined the genus Marattia to be paraphyletic, and the genus has been split into three genera, Marattia in the strict sense, Eupodium, and Ptisana. Christenhusz and Chase placed Danaea in subfamily Danaeoideae and the remaining genera in subfamily Marattioideae, but this subfamilial classification was not taken up by PPG I.

This fern group has a long fossil history with many extinct taxa (Psaronius, Asterotheca, Scolecopteris, Eoangiopteris, Qasimia, Marantoidea, Danaeites, Marattiopsis, etc.).

Genera

Six genera are accepted in the PPG I classification:
Angiopteris Hoffm.
Christensenia Maxon
Danaea Sm.
Eupodium J.Sm.
Marattia Sw.
Ptisana Murdock
Several other genera have been named in the Marattiaceae, namely: Archangiopteris, Clementea, Macroglossum, Protangiopteris, Protomarattia and Psilodochea. These are currently treated as synonyms of Angiopteris.

Evolutionary history 
Marattiaceae are considered one of the most primitive living lineages of ferns. The earliest members of the family appeared during the Carboniferous, over 300 million years ago. The group has an extensive fossil record extending from the Carboniferous into the Jurassic, but post-Jurassic records are scarce.

References

External links
 Tree of Life Marattiaceae

Marattiidae
Fern families